Higher-order volitions (or higher-order desire), as opposed to action-determining volitions, are volitions about volitions. Higher-order volitions are potentially more often guided by long-term beliefs and reasoning.

A first-order volition is a desire about anything else, such as to own a new car, to meet the pope, or to drink alcohol.  Second-order volition are desires about desires, or to desire to change the process, the how, of desiring.     Examples would be desires to want to own a new car; to want to meet the Pope; or to want to quit drinking alcohol permanently. A higher-order volition can go unfulfilled due to uncontrolled lower-order volitions.

An example for a failure to follow higher-order volitions is the drug addict who takes drugs even though they would like to quit taking drugs. According to Harry Frankfurt the drug addict has established free will when their higher-order volition to stop wanting drugs determines the precedence of their changing, action-determining desires either to take drugs or not to take drugs.

See also
 Akrasia
 Meta-emotion

References

Free will
Motivation